Strictly Dishonorable is a 1951 romantic comedy film written, produced and directed by Melvin Frank and Norman Panama, and starring Ezio Pinza and Janet Leigh. It is the second film to be based on Preston Sturges' 1929 hit Broadway play of the same name after a pre-Code film released by Universal Pictures in 1931 with the same title.

Plot
In New York in the 1920s, amorous opera star Augustino "Gus" Caraffa (Ezio Pinza) crosses paths with Isabelle Perry (Janet Leigh), a naive music student from Mississippi who is his biggest fan. When a news photographer catches them in a kiss, it is proposed that they get married in name only to avoid a scandal.  Isabelle, who is in love with Gus, agrees to the charade, hoping that he will eventually fall in love with her.

Cast
Ezio Pinza as  Count Augustino "Gus" Caraffa
Janet Leigh as  Isabelle Perry
Millard Mitchell as Bill Dempsey
Gale Robbins as Marie Donnelly
Maria Palmer as Countess Lili Szadvany
Esther Minciotti as Mme. Maria Caraffa
Silvio Minciotti as Uncle Nito
Arthur Franz as Henry Greene
Sandro Giglio as Tomasso
Hugh Sanders as Harry Donnelly
Mario Siletti as Luigi

Production notes
Opera and Broadway star Pinza had previously appeared in the film Mr. Imperium which was shot before  Strictly Dishonorable, but  Strictly Dishonorable was released first, so that film marked his dramatic acting debut. Pinza went on to make only one more film, Tonight We Sing (1953) for Twentieth Century-Fox, with Roberta Peters and Isaac Stern.
Greta Garbo, John Gilbert and Lewis Stone among others, appear in archival footage from the MGM silent film A Woman of Affairs (1928).  Stone played the part of "Judge Dempsey" in the 1931 version of Strictly Dishonorable.
 The operatic scenes were staged by Vladimir Rosing.
"Dempsey" was the maiden name of Preston Sturges' mother.
The prolific comic character actress Kathleen Freeman appears uncredited as a movie theatre organist.
Scott R. Beal, who appears uncredited in the bit part of a vendor, was primarily an assistant director.  He received an Academy Award as "Best Assistant Director" in 1934 and was nominated again in 1935.

Songs
"I'll See You in My Dreams" - by Isham Jones (music) and Gus Kahn (lyrics)
"Everything I Have Is Yours" - by Burton Lane (music) and Harold Adamson (lyrics)
"La veau d'or" from the opera Faust - by Charles Gounod (music) and Jules Barbier and Michel Carré (libretto)
"Se a caso madama" from the opera Le nozze di Figaro - by Wolfgang Amadeus Mozart (music) and Lorenzo da Ponte (libretto)
Unnamed aria from the opera Il ritorno di Césare - by Mario Castelnuovo-Tedesco (music and lyrics)

Notes:
Il ritorno di Césare is a fictitious opera created by Mario Castelnuovo-Tedesco for the film, and staged by Vladimir Rosing.

Production
Preston Sturges approached Metro-Goldwyn-Mayer with the idea of doing a remake of Strictly Dishonorable with Ezio Pinza, and received $60,000 for the rights, but was disappointed when he was not hired to write the screenplay.

Strictly Dishonorable was in production from mid-January to mid-March 1951, and was released on 3 July of that year.

Reception
According to MGM records the film earned $660,000 in the US and Canada and $221,000 elsewhere, resulting in a loss of $664,000.

Adaptations
Lux Radio Theatre broadcast a radio adaptation of the film on December 8, 1952, with Janet Leigh reprising her role and Fernando Lamas replacing Pinza.

Notes

External links

1951 films
1951 romantic comedy films
American romantic comedy films
American black-and-white films
1950s English-language films
American films based on plays
Films directed by Melvin Frank
Films directed by Norman Panama
Metro-Goldwyn-Mayer films
Films based on works by Preston Sturges
Films about opera
Films about singers
Films set in the 1920s
1950s American films